Giovanni Lorenzo Bertolotti (1640–1721) was an Italian painter of the Baroque period, active in Genoa.

He trained under Giovanni Benedetto Castiglione. Bertolotti contributed paintings to the Oratory of San Giacomo della Marina and the Basilica della Santissima Annunziata. He painted a Visitation of the Virgin to Saint Elizabeth for the church of La Visitazione.

References

1640 births
1721 deaths
17th-century Italian painters
Italian male painters
18th-century Italian painters
Painters from Genoa
Italian Baroque painters
18th-century Italian male artists